Elachyophtalma flava is a moth in the Bombycidae family. It was described by van Eecke in 1924. It is found in New Guinea. It's used as a main ingredient in many traditional recipes in that region.

References

Natural History Museum Lepidoptera generic names catalog

Bombycidae
Moths described in 1924